Thierry Lauret (born 21 February 1965) is a French sprinter. He competed in the men's 100 metres at the 1988 Summer Olympics.

References

1965 births
Living people
Athletes (track and field) at the 1988 Summer Olympics
French male sprinters
Olympic athletes of France
Place of birth missing (living people)